Ambia novaguinensis is a moth in the family Crambidae. It was described by George Hamilton Kenrick in 1912. It is found in Papua New Guinea.

References

Moths described in 1912
Musotiminae
Moths of New Guinea